Chills & Fever is the fourth studio album by American singer-songwriter Samantha Fish. It was released on March 17, 2017.

The album was produced by Bobby Harlow. It was recorded at The 45 Factory, Detroit, MI.

Critical reception 
Tom O'Connor writing for Rock and Blues Muse gave it a mixed but generally favourable review, stating that "for the most part it works", describing the album as "clean, compressed and polished".

Track listing

Personnel 
Adapted from the liner notes.

 Samantha Fish – vocals, lead guitar
 Steve Nawara – bass guitar
 Kenny Tudrick – drums
 Bob Mervak – electric piano
 Joe Mazzola – rhythm guitar
 Travis Blotsky – saxophone
 Mark Levron – trumpet

Charts

References 

2017 albums
Samantha Fish albums